Todd Hackwelder is an American artist living in Taiwan. Originally from New York Hackwelder lives in Wujie. The magazine Discontinued was started by Hackwelder in 2003, as a free way for the public to find contemporary art in Taiwan.

Hackwelder became a full-time artist in 2007. He displayed his art in an exhibition called "Blues 53" which was hosted at the Beat Studio Gallery in August 2007. The following year his artwork appeared in the "Wild East Art Show". Hackwelder has painted some  350 paintings in varies styles and themes.

With his series, "One Eyed Clown" Hackwelder began signing his paintings using his Chinese name Hai Ke-ha (海克哈).

References

External links
 

American contemporary artists
Year of birth missing (living people)
Living people